Embeddable Common Lisp (ECL) is a small implementation of the ANSI Common Lisp programming language that can be used stand-alone or embedded in extant applications written in C. It creates OS-native executables and libraries (i.e. Executable and Linkable Format (ELF) files on unix) from Common Lisp code, and runs on most platforms that support a C compiler. The ECL runtime is a dynamically loadable library for use by applications. It is distributed as free software under a GNU Lesser Public License (LGPL) 2.1+.

It includes a runtime system, and two compilers, a bytecode interpreter allowing applications to be deployed where no C compiler is expected, and an intermediate language type, which compiles Common Lisp to C for a more efficient runtime. The latter also features a native foreign function interface (FFI), that supports inline C as part of Common Lisp. Inline C FFI combined with Common Lisp macros, custom Lisp setf expansions and compiler-macros, result in a custom compile-time C preprocessor.

External links 
 Giuseppe Attardi. "The Embeddable Common Lisp", ACM Lisp Pointers 8(1), 1995, 30-41.
 
 Embeddable Common-Lisp on GitLab

Common Lisp implementations
Common Lisp (programming language) software
Free compilers and interpreters